Betta burdigala is a species of gourami endemic to Bangka Island in Indonesia. It is an inhabitant of peat swamps.

References

burdigala
Freshwater fish of Indonesia
Fish described in 1994
Taxa named by Maurice Kottelat
Taxonomy articles created by Polbot